He Ying (born April 17, 1977 in Jilin) is an archer from the People's Republic of China who has competed at three Summer Olympics.

Career

1996 Summer Olympics

In 1996 Atlanta Olympics He won the silver in the women's individual event.  She competed again in 2000 in Sydney but did not win a medal.

2004 Summer Olympics
He achieved the second Olympic silver medal of her career at the 2004 Summer Olympics in the team event. With teammates Lin Sang and Zhang Juanjuan, He defeated Australia, Ukraine and Chinese Taipei in the elimination rounds before falling to South Korea in the gold medal match by a single match.

He placed 4th in the individual ranking round with a score of 667. He went on to defeat Helen Palmer of Great Britain, Melissa Jennison of Australia and Kirstin Jean Lewis of South Africa in the first three rounds, her encounter with Jennison going to a final arrow shoot-off.

In the quarterfinals, He faced eventual bronze medalist Alison Williamson of Great Britain. He was red carded for shooting out of turn, resulting in her highest scoring shot being declared void. She later missed the target entirely with her 10th shot, Williamson winning by a score of 109–89. The Chinese team officials planned to appeal against the result but failed to do so within the allowed time. Her final ranking in the individual competition was 8th.

Asian Games

He competed in the 1994 Asian Games where she won a gold medal in the team event and in the 1998 Asian Games where she won a silver medal in the team event.

Coaching career
She is the coach of Li Jiaman who won the 2014 Summer Youth Olympics girls' individual and mixed team gold.

References

External links
Profile on World Archery website

1977 births
Living people
Archers at the 1996 Summer Olympics
Archers at the 2000 Summer Olympics
Archers at the 2004 Summer Olympics
Chinese female archers
Olympic archers of China
Olympic silver medalists for China
People from Siping
Olympic medalists in archery
Asian Games medalists in archery
Sportspeople from Jilin
Medalists at the 2004 Summer Olympics
Archers at the 1994 Asian Games
Archers at the 1998 Asian Games
Asian Games gold medalists for China
Asian Games silver medalists for China
World Archery Championships medalists
Medalists at the 1996 Summer Olympics
Medalists at the 1994 Asian Games
Medalists at the 1998 Asian Games